Voorschoten is a village and municipality in the western Netherlands, in the province of South Holland. It is a smaller town in the Randstad, enclosed by the cities of Leiden, Wassenaar and The Hague.

The town is relatively affluent, and the majority of Voorschoten's population are commuters, generally to either the Hague or Leiden. Despite the fact that it is situated in one of the most densely populated areas in the Netherlands, and, indeed, the world, the town retains a strong, independent identity and village-like atmosphere. Several buildings of historical importance are situated in Voorschoten. For example, the old Castle Duivenvoorde,  and the Manor Vredenhof - rebuilt by Diederik Jansz. Graeff, and until the 18th century in the hands from the De Graeff family - are located in or near Voorschoten.

The town's proximity to the Hague, as well as the presence of the British School in the Netherlands in the town, and the American School of the Hague in nearby Wassenaar, means that Voorschoten has a large community of expatriates, particularly British nationals.

Floris V of Holland granted Voorschoten market rights in 1282.

In recent years, the settlement has seen considerable expansion, with the addition of several new areas of housing, such as Starrenburg, Krimwijk II and, most recently, Voorsche Park. The town benefits from excellent sporting and recreational facilities, including hockey, football and baseball clubs, a tennis club, a swimming pool and a golf course. There are a number of churches located throughout the town, the two most striking of which are the main church, located in Voorschoten's historic centre, and the St. Laurentius Church, located in the north of the town.

Local government 
The municipal council of Voorschoten consists of 21 seats, which are divided as follows (from the most recent election results in 2022 ):

Public transportation
Voorschoten has excellent public transport links to the rest of the Randstad. The Voorschoten railway station is situated on the Amsterdam–Rotterdam railway and trains run regularly toward The Hague and Amsterdam.

Notable people 

 Melchior Treub (1851–1910) a Dutch botanist, founded the Bogor Agricultural Institute
 Lodewijk Thomson (1869–1914) a Dutch military commander and politician
 Max van der Stoel (1924–2011) a Dutch politician, diplomat and jurist
 Piet Bukman (born 1934) a retired Dutch politician, diplomat and economist
 Benk Korthals (born 1944) a retired Dutch politician and jurist
 Helma Neppérus (born 1950) a Dutch politician, former tax inspector, rower and municipal councillor of Voorschoten from 2002
 Henk A. M. J. ten Have (born 1951) a professor of healthcare ethics
 Han Schuil (born 1958) a Dutch multimedia artist, uses compactness and tension in painting
 Hans Vijlbrief (born 1963) a Dutch civil servant, economist, and State Secretary for Finance
 Rolf Muntz (born 1969) a Dutch professional golfer

Gallery

Climate

References

External links 

Official website

 
Municipalities of South Holland
Populated places in South Holland